Gunnell may refer to:
Adrian Gunnell (born 1972), English snooker player
Allen Thomson Gunnell (1848-1907), American lawyer, judge, and politician
David Gunnell, English epidemiologist
Grant Gunnell (born 1999), American football player
John Gunnell (1933–2008), Labour Party politician
John Gunnell (cricketer), English cricketer
John T. Gunnell (1836-1902), American politician
Micah Gunnell (born 1980), American comic artist and animation director
Rich Gunnell (born 1987), American football player
Richard Gunnell (fl. 1613–1634), English actor, playwright and theatre manager
Robert Gunnell (1927-2014), British broadcaster
Sally Gunnell (born 1966), British track and field athlete
W. Gunnell (Surrey cricketer), English cricketer

See also 
John Gunnell House
William Gunnell House (disambiguation)